Amblyseius coffeae is a species of mite in the family Phytoseiidae.

References

coffeae
Articles created by Qbugbot
Animals described in 1961